Vasaloppet de la Sergerie is a cross-country skiing event held around Le Norvégien in the Quebec province in Canada. The event was first held in 2007.

Held in February or early March, the event is named after Vasaloppet in Sweden.

References 

2007 establishments in Quebec
February sporting events
March sporting events
Recurring sporting events established in 2007
Skiing in Quebec
Ski marathons
Sports competitions in Quebec